The Sourdough Mountain Lookout is a fire lookout that was built by the Civilian Conservation Corps in 1933. Constructed atop Sourdough Mountain in North Cascades National Park, in the U.S. state of Washington, the lookout was placed on the National Register of Historic Places in 1989.

An earlier lookout was erected at the site in 1917 but was torn down when the current lookout was constructed. The walls are composed of shiplap siding and the structure is covered with a wood-shingled hip roof. Diagonally-braced plywood shutters could be swung open for observation in each direction. The structure is no longer used on a regular basis but is visited with some frequency by hikers and it is a  hike to the cabin from the trailhead.

References

Fire lookout towers on the National Register of Historic Places in Washington (state)
Buildings and structures completed in 1933
Buildings and structures in Whatcom County, Washington
Aircraft Warning Service
National Register of Historic Places in North Cascades National Park
Civilian Conservation Corps in Washington (state)
National Register of Historic Places in Whatcom County, Washington